Garland "Chief" Nevitt (February 28, 1887 – August 1970) was an American football, basketball, and baseball coach.  He served as the head football coach at Central Michigan University for one season in 1919, compiling a record of 2–2–3. He also coached the basketball team at Central Michigan that year to a 10–5 record. He played Minor League Baseball with the Battle Creek Crickets of the Southern Michigan League from 1911 to 1913 and with the St. Thomas Saints of the Canadian League from 1914 to 1915.

Early life
A member of the Lenape tribe who also had African-American heritage, Nevitt was born in 1887 in Kansas.

Head coaching record

College football

References

External links
 

1887 births
1970 deaths
Baseball catchers
Battle Creek Crickets players
Black Native American people
Central Michigan Chippewas baseball coaches
Central Michigan Chippewas football coaches
Central Michigan Chippewas men's basketball coaches
St. Thomas Saints players
Lenape people
Native American sportspeople
20th-century Native Americans